José Doval Garcia (born 17 March 1966), sometimes credited as José Luis Garcia, is a Spanish-French film and television actor.

Early life and education 
He was born as José Doval in Paris, France.

At age 20, he received two years of training in the Classe libre ("Free Class") for actors at the Cours Florent in Paris, with Francis Huster as a teacher. He completed his training through the Annie Fratellini Circus School (where he met his future wife Isabelle Doval) and taught in France following an Actors Studio course.

He also holds a degree in accounting.

Career 

Since 1989, Garcia has made acting appearances in over forty-five films. Additionally, he has made appearances, some in acting roles but mostly as himself, in over twenty television productions.

Filmography

References

External links 

  
 
 

1966 births
Living people
French male film actors
French people of Spanish descent
French male television actors
Cours Florent alumni